The 2016 United States presidential election in Michigan was held on Tuesday, November 8, 2016, as part of the 2016 United States presidential election in which all 50 states plus the District of Columbia participated. Michigan voters chose electors to represent them in the Electoral College via a popular vote, pitting the Republican Party's nominee, businessman and reality TV game show host Donald Trump, and running mate, former Radio DJ and Indiana Governor Mike Pence against Democratic Party nominee, former Secretary of State Hillary Clinton, and her running mate Virginia Senator Tim Kaine. Michigan has 16 electoral votes in the Electoral College.

In the general election, Trump unexpectedly won Michigan by a narrow margin of 0.23%, with 47.50% of the total votes over Clinton's 47.27%. This is the narrowest margin of victory in Michigan's history in presidential elections, as well as the narrowest margin of any state in the 2016 election. Michigan was the last state to be called in the 2016 election with many networks calling its result around 2 weeks afterward. All of Michigan's 16 Electoral College votes were thus assigned to Trump. Trump's victory in Michigan was attributed to overwhelming and underestimated support from working-class voters, a demographic group that had previously tended to vote for the Democratic candidate. By winning Michigan, Trump became the first Republican presidential candidate to win the state since George H. W. Bush in 1988. Michigan also became one of eleven states to vote for Bill Clinton in 1992 and 1996 which Hillary Clinton lost.

Michigan weighed in for this election as 2.32 points more Republican than the national average. This was the first time that Michigan voted to the right of the nation since 1988 and the first time since 1976 that it voted more than 2 points to the right of the country as a whole and when the Democratic nominee won the popular vote without Michigan. It was also the only time since 1976 in which Michigan voted to the right of Nevada.

Primary elections

Democratic primary

The 2016 Michigan Democratic presidential primary was held on March 8 in the U.S. state of Michigan as one of the Democratic Party's primaries ahead of the 2016 presidential election. On the same day, the Republican Party held primaries in four states, including their own Michigan primary. Bernie Sanders' narrow win was one of the largest upsets in American political history, with polling before the primary showing him trailing Hillary Clinton by an average of 21.4 points.

Results
Four candidates appeared on the Democratic presidential primary ballot:

Republican primary
Four candidates participated in the Republican primary.

Debate
Detroit, March 3 

The eleventh debate was held on March 3, 2016, at the Fox Theatre in downtown Detroit, Michigan. It was the third debate to air on Fox News Channel. Special Report anchor Bret Baier, The Kelly File anchor Megyn Kelly and Fox News Sunday host Chris Wallace served as moderators. It led into the Maine, Kansas, Kentucky, Louisiana, Michigan, Mississippi, Idaho, and Hawaii contests. Fox announced that in order for candidates to qualify, they must have at least 3 percent support in the five most recent national polls by March 1 at 5 pm. Ben Carson said on March 2 he would not be attending the debate.

Results
Thirteen candidates appeared on the Republican presidential primary ballot:

General election
Although won by Democratic candidates in every election since 1992, sometimes by decisive margins, in 2016 Michigan was considered a swing state and received much attention from Republican party candidate Donald Trump. Hillary Clinton's campaign was confident they would win the state, and projected a 5-point win up until election day. Trump was able to win the state for the first time since George H. W. Bush won it in 1988, albeit by a narrow 0.23% margin of victory. On Election Day, Detroit Free Press had prematurely called the state for Clinton at 9:15pm before retracting the call three hours later, an error which had been common in many sources at the 2000 election, in the states of Florida and New Mexico. Donald Trump's upset victory highlighted Michigan's new status as a swing state, being bitterly contested in the 2020 election, when former Democratic Vice President Joe Biden narrowly flipped it back into the Democratic column. Trump's State Campaign was run by Scott Hagerstrom (State Director), CJ Galdes (Deputy State Director), Christopher Morris (Field Director), and Tia Jurkiw (Events Coordinator).

Predictions

Polling

Except for losing one poll in August 2015, and tying with Trump in a poll in September 2015, Clinton won every pre-election poll with margins between 4 and 12 points until November 2016. In late October 2016, Clinton's lead narrowed significantly towards the election. Trump also won the last poll conducted on election day 49% to 47%. The average of the last three polls had Clinton leading Trump 47.6% to 45%. Ultimately, Trump's win here was an extreme surprise.

Minor candidates
The following were given write-in status:
 Cherunda Fox
 Ben Hartnell
 Tom Hoefling
 Laurence Kotlikoff
 Evan McMullin
 Mike Maturen
 Monica Moorehead

Results

Results by county 
Final official results from the Michigan Secretary of State.

Counties that flipped from Democratic to Republican 

Bay (largest city: Bay City)
Calhoun (largest city: Battle Creek)
Eaton (largest city: Charlotte)
Gogebic (largest city: Ironwood)
Isabella (largest city: Mount Pleasant)
Lake (largest village: Baldwin)
Macomb (largest city: Warren)
Manistee (largest city: Manistee)
Monroe (largest city: Monroe)
Saginaw (largest city: Saginaw)
Shiawassee (largest city: Owosso)
Van Buren (largest city: South Haven)

By congressional district
Trump won 9 of 14 congressional districts.

Recount
The Michigan Board of Canvassers certified Trump's lead of 10,704 votes over Clinton, a 0.23% margin, on November 28. The deadline to request a recount was then set for November 30 at 2:00 p.m. That same day, Green Party candidate Jill Stein's campaign requested a hand recount, but the recount was halted December 1 after the state received an objection from Trump representatives. The objection was rejected by Michigan's Bureau of Elections on December 2, and a federal judge ordered the recount to start again on December 5. Finally, the recount was halted on December 7 after a federal judge issued an order to Michigan's Board of Elections, thus making Trump's win official.

See also
 United States presidential elections in Michigan
 Presidency of Donald Trump
 2016 Democratic Party presidential debates and forums
 2016 Democratic Party presidential primaries
 2016 Republican Party presidential debates and forums
 2016 Republican Party presidential primaries

References

Further reading

External links
 2016 Michigan Election Results
 RNC 2016 Republican Nominating Process 
 Green papers for 2016 primaries, caucuses, and conventions

MI
2016
Presidential